The Eyalet of Bosnia, was an eyalet (administrative division, also known as a beylerbeylik) of the Ottoman Empire, mostly based on the territory of the present-day state of Bosnia and Herzegovina. Prior to the Great Turkish War, it had also included most of Slavonia, Lika, and Dalmatia in present-day Croatia.

Background
After the execution of King Stephen Tomašević in 1463, the central part of the Kingdom of Bosnia was transformed into the sanjak of Bosnia. The Duchy of Herzegovina was added in 1483.

History

Establishment
In 1580, Ferhad Pasha Sokolović became the first governor of the Bosnia Eyalet, as beylerbey (also referred to as "pasha"). The Bosnia Eyalet (or Pashaluk) included the Sanjak of Bosnia (central province), Sanjak of Herzegovina, Sanjak of Vučitrn, Sanjak of Prizren, Sanjak of Klis, Sanjak of Krka, and Sanjak of Pakrac.
 
The Ottoman wars in Europe continued throughout the period, and the province reached its territorial peak in 1683.

Decline
The Great Turkish War that ended in Ottoman defeat in 1699 led to a significant decrease in the territory of the Eyalet, losing all the Slavonian sanjaks ("Požeški sandžak" and "Pakrački sandžak"), the sanjak of Lika and big parts of the Dalmatian coast from the sanjaks of Klisa and Herzegovina. The Eyalet lost three sanjaks and suppressed one (the sanjak of Bihać): after the Treaty of Karlowitz, the province was down to four sanjaks (three of them diminished in size as well) and twelve captaincies. Before the Treaty of Passarowitz, another 28 military captaincies were formed, more than half of them along the frontier. This kind of intensive military administration corresponded to the Austrian Military Frontier on the other side of the same border. In 1703 the seat of the pasha was moved from Sarajevo to Travnik, because Sarajevo had been destroyed by fire in the war; it wouldn't be moved back until 1850.

Bosnian uprising

At the beginning of the 19th century, Bosnia was one of the least developed and more autonomous provinces of the Empire. In 1831, Bosnian kapudan Husein Gradaščević, after meeting in Tuzla with Bosnian aristocrats from 20 January to 5 February for preparations, finally occupied Travnik, demanding autonomy and the end of military reforms in Bosnia. Ultimately, exploiting the rivalries between beys and kapudans, the grand vizier succeeded in detaching the Herzegovinian forces, led by Ali-paša Rizvanbegović, from Gradaščević's. The revolt was crushed, and in 1833, a new eyalet of Herzegovina was created from the southern part of the eyalet of Bosnia and given to Ali-paša Rizvanbegović as a reward for his contribution in crushing the uprising. This new entity lasted only for a few years: after Rizvanbegović's death, it was reintegrated into the Bosnia eyalet.

It was one of the first Ottoman provinces to become a vilayet after an administrative reform in 1865, and by 1867 it had been reformed into the Bosnia Vilayet.

Administration

Administrative divisions

Capitals
Bosnia Eyalet's capital city moved several times:
 Travnik (1553; 1697–1833; 1839/40–1851)
 Banja Luka (Banyaluka or Banaluka) (1553–1638)
 Sarajevo (Saray Bosna) (1639–1697; 1833–1839/40; 1851–1878)

Governors

Sarı Süleyman Pasha
Osman Gradaščević
 Abaza Mehmed Pasha
Hasan Predojević
Husein Gradaščević
Husein Boljanić
Ali-paša Rizvanbegović
Mehmed-beg Kulenović
Bekir Pasha (1800–01)

See also

 List of Ottoman governors of Bosnia
 Ottoman Bosnia and Herzegovina
 Pashaluk of Herzegovina
 Sanjak of Novi Pazar

References

Sources
 

Eyalets of the Ottoman Empire in Europe

Ottoman Serbia
Ottoman period in the history of Montenegro
Ottoman period in the Balkans
1580 establishments in the Ottoman Empire
1867 disestablishments in the Ottoman Empire
Eyalet
Eyalet
Eyalet
Eyalet
States and territories established in 1580
States and territories disestablished in 1867
1580 establishments in Europe
1867 disestablishments in Europe
Former subdivisions of Bosnia and Herzegovina during Ottoman period